David C. Debol (born 27 March 1956) is an American former professional ice hockey player.

Debol played 92 games for the NHL Hartford Whalers and 68 games for the WHA Cincinnati Stingers between 1978 and 1981. He was also a member of the University of Michigan hockey team before turning professional. Debol played for the United States at the Ice Hockey World Championships in 1977, 1978 and 1981. Debol also played for the Michigan Wolverines hockey team and has been inducted into the University of Michigan Athletic Hall of Honor.

Early life
Debol is native of St. Clair Shores, Michigan. As a youth, he played in the 1967 and 1968 Quebec International Pee-Wee Hockey Tournaments with a minor ice hockey team from St. Clair Shores.

University of Michigan
Debol enrolled at the University of Michigan where he competed for a position on the Michigan Wolverines hockey team as a walk-on player. He made the team and became an All-American center who led the Wolverines to the finals of the NCAA's Frozen Four ice hockey championship, where they lost in overtime to Wisconsin. Debol was called "the Guy Lafleur of college hockey" and was considered the best offensive player at Michigan since Red Berenson. As a sophomore, Debol scored three goals in less than one minute to set an NCAA record. In March 1977, Debol tied Red Berenson's 14-year-old record for most goals scored in a season by a Michigan Wolverines hockey player with his 42nd goal. He finished the year with 43 goals. Debol set Michigan records for most assists in a season (56), most points in a season (99), career assists (120) and career points (222). As a senior, Debol led the WCHA in scoring with 43 goals and 56 assists.

Professional hockey
Debol was highly sought after by professional hockey teams. The Chicago Black Hawks acquired his NHL rights, and the New England Whalers acquired his WHA rights. The Whalers traded Debol's rights to the Edmonton Oilers, and in December 1977, the Oilers traded negotiating rights to Debol to the Cincinnati Stingers for Dennis Sobchuk.  Debol signed with the Stingers in March 1978. Playing in his rookie season, Debol had 10 goals and 27 assists when he was struck in the eye with a hockey stick in a game against Winnipeg in March 1979. The following month, Debol underwent surgery at Bethesda Hospital in Cincinnati to re-attach the flap of the retina on his left eye. Debol returned from the injury and was selected by the Hartford Whalers in the 1979 Dispersal Draft when the WHA merged with the NHL. Debol played for the Whalers from 1979–1981. Playing on the same team as Gordie Howe and his sons Mark and Marty, When Debol was born in 1956 in a Detroit suburb, Gordie Howe had already played ten seasons with the Detroit Red Wings, and in 1980 Debol was teammates with the 52-year-old Howe in his final NHL season. Debol had 26 goals and 26 assists in 92 games for the Whalers.

Later years
After retiring as a hockey player, Debol coached high school hockey at Dexter High School in Michigan. He currently coaches college hockey at the University of Michigan–Dearborn, in the ACHA Division I ranks. Debol has also owned and operated hockey schools, including Hockey Masters in Chelsea, Michigan, and also Debol & Donnelly Skill Development.

Debol lives in Saline, and has a son and a daughter, both of whom are hockey players.

In 1996, Debol was inducted into the University of Michigan Athletic Hall of Honor.

On 10 May 2016, Debol was named the inaugural head coach of his hometown team, the St. Clair Shores Fighting Saints of the Federal Hockey League.

Career statistics

Regular season and playoffs

International

Awards and honors

References

External links

1956 births
Living people
AHCA Division I men's ice hockey All-Americans
American men's ice hockey centers
American ice hockey coaches
Binghamton Whalers players
Birmingham South Stars players
Chicago Blackhawks draft picks
Cincinnati Stingers (CHL) players
Cincinnati Stingers players
Cincinnati Tigers players
Hartford Whalers players
Ice hockey coaches from Michigan
Michigan Wolverines men's ice hockey players
New England Whalers draft picks
Oklahoma City Stars players
People from St. Clair Shores, Michigan
Sportspeople from Metro Detroit
Springfield Indians players
University of Michigan–Dearborn people
Ice hockey players from Michigan